Srđan Vuksanović (born 5 July 1992) is a Kazakhstani water polo player. He competed in the men's tournament at the 2020 Summer Olympics.

References

External links
 

1992 births
Living people
Kazakhstani male water polo players
Olympic water polo players of Kazakhstan
Water polo players at the 2020 Summer Olympics
Sportspeople from Novi Sad
21st-century Kazakhstani people